Testa is a surname that literally means "head" in Italian. Notable people with the surname include:

 Alberto Testa (dancer) (born 1922), Italian dancer
 Alberto Testa (lyricist) (1927–2009), Italian composer and lyricist
 Anthony Joseph Testa (born 1987), American choreographer, creative director, educator, and dancer
 Augusto Testa (born 1950), Italian astronomer
 Armando Testa (1917–1992), Italian graphic designer
 Chicco Testa (born 1952), managing director of Rothschild Spa
 Chuck Testa, American taxidermist and Internet meme
 Clorindo Testa (1923–2013), Italian-Argentine architect and artist
 Dante Testa (1861-1923), Italian actor and director
 Eugenio Testa (1892–1957), Italian actor and film director
 Ezio Testa (writer) (born 1961), Italian fiction author and poet
 Federica Testa (born 1993), Italian-born former competitive ice dancer
 Franco Testa (born 1938), Italian cyclist
 Franco Testa (water polo) (born 1982), Argentine water polo player
 Gianmaria Testa (1958–2016), Italian singer-songwriter
 Gustavo Testa (1886–1969), Italian Cardinal of the Roman Catholic Church
 Joseph Testa (born 1955), New York city mobster
 Karina Testa (born 1981), French actress
 Mary Testa (born 1955), American stage actress
 Nick Testa (born 1928), American baseball player and coach
 Olivier Testa (born 1977), French speleologist and explorer
 Philip Testa (1924–1981), American Mafia figure
 Pietro Testa (1611–1650), Italian High Baroque artist
 Salvatore Testa (1956–1984), hitman for the Philadelphia crime family
 Serge Testa (born 1950), Australian yachtsman
 Tony Testa (born 1987), American choreographer

Italian-language surnames